Huntingtin-associated protein 1 (HAP1) is a protein which in humans is encoded by the HAP1 gene. This protein was found to bind to the mutant huntingtin protein in proportion to the number of glutamines present in the glutamine repeat region.

Huntington's disease (HD), a neurodegenerative disorder characterized by loss of striatal neurons, is caused by an expansion of a polyglutamine tract in the HD protein huntingtin. This gene encodes a protein that interacts with huntingtin, with two cytoskeletal proteins (dynactin and pericentriolar autoantigen protein 1), and with a hepatocyte growth factor-regulated tyrosine kinase substrate (HGS). The interactions with cytoskeletal proteins and a kinase substrate suggest a role for this protein in vesicular trafficking or organelle transport.

Variants 

Huntingtin-associated protein 1 has two subtypes; HAP1A and HAP1B.

Function 

Its localization and possible interacting partners (other than Htt) have since been characterised, thus elucidating a possible role for this protein in HD pathogenesis. Martin et al. showed that HAP1 is localized in mitotic spindle of dividing striatal cells, and associated endosomes, microtubules and vesicles in the basal forebrain and striatial neurons – where HAP1B is preferentially expressed. Furthermore, Page and colleagues identified HAP1 mRNA in the following forebrain limbic nuclei: the amygdala, nucleus accumbens, dentate gyrus, septal nuclei, bed nucleus of the stria terminalis, and hypothalamus. They also identified HAP1 in numerous areas of the cortex, including the anterior cingulate cortex and the limbic cortex.

The subcellular location of HAP1 closely resembles that of Htt. They did not find HAP1 labeling in protein aggregates in the cytoplasm and postulated that this indicated HAP1 in pre-aggregate related HD pathogenesis.

The role of HAP1 in HD pathogenesis may involve aberration of cell cycle processes, as high immunostaining of HAP1 during the cell cycle has been observed. It may have a part in spindle orientation, microtubule stabilization or chromosome movement. More importantly, HAP1 may also disrupt endocytosis, as it has been detected on vesicles involved in the early stages of this process. HAP1 also interacts with proteins other than Htt and it is likely that their function is altered in HD pathogenesis. These include dynactin p150Glued, a cytoplasmic dynein accessory protein involved in retrograde transport of organelles, and kinesin-like protein which is another transport-mediation protein.

HAP1 also shows a similar CNS distribution pattern to that of neural nitric oxide synthase (nNos), especially in both of the pedunculopontine nuclei, the supraoptic nucleus, and the olfactory bulb.  The possible significance of this interaction is that increased HAP1 interaction with muHtt may also increase nitric oxide (NO) thus facilitating neuronal damage.

HAP1 also interacts with other factors involved in vesicular trafficking including GABAA receptor, 
Rho-GEF, and HGS.

References

Proteins